Ömer Sepici (born September 30, 1987 in The Hague) is a Turkish football player who was born and grew up in the Netherlands. He last played as a goalkeeper for Ünyespor in the TFF Third League.

References

1987 births
Living people
Turkish footballers
Dutch footballers
MKE Ankaragücü footballers
Footballers from The Hague
Dutch people of Turkish descent

Association football goalkeepers